Disguise the Limit is the debut mixtape by American rapper Nyck Caution. It was released on February 29, 2016, by Cinematic Music Group and Pro Era Records.

Background
The mixtape includes features from Pro Era members Joey Bada$$ and Kirk Knight, as well as Madison Iman, Tyler Sherrit, The Mind, and Alex Mali. The mixtape includes production from Kirk Knight, Chuck Strangers, Rel & Sharp, Bruce Leekix, Navie D, Slauson Malone, J Money, and Metro Boomin.

Singles
On January 7, 2016, Nyck Caution released the music video for "Church". A week later, he released three new tracks, "Nyctophilia", "Light Through The Cracks (Oh My Freestyle)", and "What's Understood". On March 11, he released the music video for "Basin".

Track listing
Producer credits adapted from Pro Era's official website.

References

2016 mixtape albums
Cinematic Music Group albums
Pro Era albums
Nyck Caution albums
Albums produced by Kirk Knight